German International School of The Hague (DiSDH) is a German international school in The Hague. It includes levels Kindergarten through Sekundarstufe II (senior high school).

References

External links

 German International School of The Hague
  German International School of The Hague

German international schools in Europe
Schools in The Hague
International schools in the Netherlands